The World3 model is a system dynamics model for computer simulation of interactions between population, industrial growth, food production and limits in the ecosystems of the earth. It was originally produced and used by a Club of Rome study that produced the model and the book The Limits to Growth (1972). The creators of the model were Dennis Meadows, project manager, and a team of 16 researchers.

The model was documented in the book Dynamics of Growth in a Finite World. It added new features to Jay Wright Forrester's World2 model. Since World3 was originally created, it has had minor tweaks to get to the World3/91 model used in the book Beyond the Limits, later improved to get the World3/2000 model distributed by the Institute for Policy and Social Science Research and finally the World3/2004 model used in the book Limits to Growth: the 30 year update.

World3 is one of several global models that have been generated throughout the world (Mesarovic/Pestel Model, Bariloche Model, MOIRA Model, SARU Model, FUGI Model) and is probably
the model that generated the spark for all later models .

Model 
The model consisted of several interacting parts.  Each of these dealt with a different system of the model.  The main systems were 
the food system, dealing with agriculture and food production
the industrial system
the population system
the non-renewable resources system
the pollution system

Agricultural system 
The simplest useful view of this system is that land and fertilizer are used for farming, and more of either will produce more food. In the context of the model, since land is finite, and industrial output required to produce fertilizer and other agricultural inputs can not keep up with demand, there necessarily will be a food collapse at some point in the future.

Nonrenewable resources system 

The nonrenewable resource system starts with the assumption that the total amount of resources available is finite (about 110 times the consumption at 1990s rates for the World3/91 model). These resources can be extracted and then used for various purposes in other systems in the model. An important assumption that was made is that as the nonrenewable resources are extracted, the remaining resources are increasingly difficult to extract, thus diverting more and more industrial output to resource extraction.

Reference run predictions 
The Dynamics of Growth in a Finite World provides several different scenarios. The "reference run" is the one that "represent the most likely behavior mode of the system if the process of industrialization in the future proceeds in a way very similar to its progress in the past, and if technologies and value changes that have already been institutionalized continue to evolve." In this scenario, in 2000, the world population reaches six billion, and then goes on to peak at seven billion in 2030. After that population declines because of an increased death rate. In 2015, both industrial output per capita and food per capita peak at US$375 per person (1970s dollars, about $ today) and 500 vegetable-equivalent kilograms/person. Persistent pollution peaks in the year 2035 at 11 times 1970s levels.

Criticism of the model 
There has been criticism of the World3 model. Some has come from the model creators themselves, some has come from economists and some has come from other places. 

In the book Groping in the Dark: The First Decade of Global Modelling, Donella Meadows (a Limits author) writes: We have great confidence in the basic qualitative assumptions and conclusions about the instability of the current global socioeconomic system and the general kinds of changes that will and will not lead to stability. We have relatively great confidence in the feedback-loop structure of the model, with some exceptions which I list below.  We have a mixed degree of confidence in the numerical parameters of the model; some are well-known physical or biological constants that are unlikely to change, some are statistically derived social indices quite likely to change, and some are pure guesses that are perhaps only of the right order of magnitude. The structural assumptions in World3 that I consider most dubious and also sensitive enough to be of concern are:

the constant capital-output ratio (which assumes no diminishing returns to capital)
the residual nature of the investment function
the generally ineffective labour contribution to output

A detailed criticism of the model is in the book Models of Doom: A Critique of the Limits to Growth.

Czech-Canadian scientist and policy analyst Vaclav Smil disagreed with the combination of physically different processes into simplified equations:

He does however consider continuous growth in world GDP a problem:

Others have put forth criticisms, such as Henshaw, King, and Zarnikau who in a 2011 paper, Systems Energy Assessment point out that the methodology of such models may be valid empirically as a world model, but might not then also be useful for decision making. The impact data being used is generally collected according to where the impacts are recorded as occurring, following standard I/O material processes accounting methods. It is not reorganized according to who pays for or profits from the impacts, so who is actually responsible for economic impacts is never determined. In their view

The economic motives causing the impacts, that might also control them, would then not be reflected in the model.
As a seeming technicality, it could bring into question the use of many kinds of economic models for sustainability decision-making.

The authors of the book Surviving 1,000 Centuries consider some of the predictions too pessimistic, but some of the overall message correct.

At least one study disagrees with the criticism. Writing in the journal Global Environmental Change, Turner notes that "30 years of historical data compare favorably with key features of the 'business-as-usual' scenario called the 'standard run' produced by the World3 model".

Validation
A number of researchers have attempted to test the predictions of the World3 model against observed data, with varying conclusions. One of the more recent of these, published in Yale's Journal of Industrial Ecology, found that current empirical data is broadly consistent with the 1972 projections, and that if major changes to the consumption of resources are not undertaken, economic growth will peak and then rapidly decline by around 2040.

References

External links and references 
"Basic Literature" : selected bibliography on limits to growth with short summary on each publication - published by All-Party Parliamentary Group (APPG) 
 Dynamics of Growth in a Finite World, by Dennis L. Meadows, William W. Behrens III, Donella H. Meadows, Roger F. Naill, Jorgen Randers, and Erich K.O. Zahn.  1974 
 World Dynamics, by Jay Wright Forrester. 1973 
 The Limits to Growth (Abstract, 8 pages, by Eduard Pestel. A Report to The Club of Rome (1972), by Donella H. Meadows, Dennis l. Meadows, Jorgen Randers, William W. Behrens III)
Limits to Growth, The 30-Year Update, by Dennis Meadows and Eric Tapley.  2004 CDRom with World3-2004 model. 
 WorldChange Model. This adds a change resistance subsystem to World3 in order to more correctly analyze and simulate why sustainability science has so far been unable to solve the sustainability problem.

Model implementations 
 Javascript world 3 simulator
 Interactive online World3 simulation
  - Python version of World3
  - A second Python version of World3
 Macintosh version of the Simulation by Kenneth L. Simons
 Implementation of the World3 model in the simulation language Modelica
  - Julia version of World3 and World2

Economics models
Environmental economics
Systems theory
Simulation software
Energy models